Andrea Piardi (born 1992 in Brescia) is an Italian rugby referee.

Career
Piardi was born in Brescia in 1992. In 2021, he was announced as an assistant referee for the 2021 Six Nations Championship for the match between Scotland and Wales. In 2021, Piardi refereed two matches in the 2023 Rugby World Cup qualifiers Americas section, refereeing Uruguay's matches against Chile and Brazil on 17 July and 25 July respectively.

References

1992 births
Living people
Italian rugby union referees
Sportspeople from Brescia
United Rugby Championship referees